London Underground strikes are a intermittent part of life in the capital of the United Kingdom. Described as "one of Britain's most strike-prone industries", the London Underground has been subject to travel disruption due to industrial action organised by the National Union of Rail, Maritime and Transport Workers (RMT) and other unions, in response to disputes over job reductions, pensions, pay, safety, and working conditions.

As of 6 December 2022, there are no Tube strikes planned before the end of the year. However, on 8 December 2022, the RMT announced the results of its latest ballot, in which 49.2 percent of its members voted in support of further walkouts over pensions and job cuts, exceeding the 40 percent needed for strike action.

Background 
Transport for London is the umbrella government body that operates the London Underground, through its subsidiary, London Underground Limited (LUL).

The largest union of Tube workers is the RMT. The others are the Aslef, the train drivers' union, and the TSSA, the Transport Salaried Staffs' Association.

Public response and impact
The Tube strike on 10 November 2022 may have cost London's economy £14 million in lost output, according to the Centre for Economics and Business Research. An estimated 78,000 commuters whose physical presence is required at work were unable to travel.

During the rail strike on 19 August 2022, more London commuters went to work compared to previous strike days. They cycled or took buses and trains, including the Elizabeth Line. The London Cycle Hire Scheme has provided an alternative means of transport during Tube strikes, but quickly reaches capacity during peak travel times.

Legislation
As of 7 December 2022, a bill requiring minimum levels of service to be maintained on transport networks during strikes had been introduced to Parliament, but had not yet been debated.

History
From 2000 to 2008, the RMT balloted for industrial action at least 50 times, resulting in member votes for strike action on 18 occasions. Overall, there were 30 separate strikes during this period.

List of past strikes and closures

References

Rail transport strikes
London Underground
Labour disputes in the United Kingdom